Gregorio Vicente (born 22 April 1969) is a Spanish sprint canoer who competed from the late 1980s to the late 1990s. Competing in three Summer Olympics, he earned his best finish of fifth in the K-4 1000 m event at Atlanta in 1996.

References

1969 births
Canoeists at the 1988 Summer Olympics
Canoeists at the 1992 Summer Olympics
Canoeists at the 1996 Summer Olympics
Living people
Olympic canoeists of Spain
Spanish male canoeists
20th-century Spanish people